Drymos, known before 1926 as Dremiglava, is a village and a community of the Oraiokastro municipality. Before the 2011 local government reform it was part of the municipality of Mygdonia, of which it was a municipal district. The 2011 census recorded 3,659 inhabitants in the village. The community of Drymos covers an area of 42.011 km2.

See also
 List of settlements in the Thessaloniki regional unit
 Mygdonia A.C.

References

Populated places in Thessaloniki (regional unit)